The Yiddish Philharmonic Chorus is a secular Jewish choir based in New York City. After World War II, it was targeted by HUAC and was renamed the Jewish People’s Philharmonic Chorus in 1948. It adopted its current name in 2021.

History

Schaefer, who was still living in Chicago when the New York choir was founded, had used the name for a previous choir in Chicago he founded in 1913–14 and had picked it to not alienate potential members or audiences who were not Communists. The New York choir was affiliated with the newspaper Morgen Freiheit, and had a strong working class identity and espoused far left or Communist politics. Many of its early members were garment workers. The choir became quite large, growing from 100 to 200 members in the first decade, most of whom were first generation Jewish immigrants who spoke Yiddish as their first language. Its repertoire was mainly in Yiddish, although it did also perform in Russian, Polish, and other European languages. In the early years both Weiner and Schaefer composed for the choir, Weiner was its conductor. It gave its first major concert at Carnegie Hall in February 1924. The choir regularly appeared at rallies and political events as well.

In 1925 the Jewish Workers Music Alliance was founded to fund Yiddish-language choirs and to publish arrangements made by FGF conductors. The FGF was closely affiliated with the International Workers Order during this period, and as other affiliated choirs were founded in more than 30 cities around the United States, the original FGF maintained an important role. Affiliated choirs in cities such as Philadelphia, Montreal and the original one in Chicago also sang under the name . The New York choir also grew large enough that various neighborhood and suburban branches of the FGF existed and rehearsed separately. New York also had a number of other progressive Yiddish choirs which were not Communist-affiliated.

Another of the choir's early successes was its February 1926 performance of Schaefer's  ("Two brothers", based on a work by I. L. Peretz) to an audience of 4000 at the Mecca Temple. Schaefer followed it with another successful oratorio,  (The twelve) which was performed at Carnegie Hall in April 1927. The main choir often performed jointly with its affiliated choirs; its fifth jubilee concert at Carnegie Hall in April 1928 was staged together with a branch from Paterson, New Jersey which Schaefer also directed.

In the 1930s, the choir under Schaefer continued to have a strong Communist and pro-Soviet orientation. The choir, accompanied by fifty members of the Manhattan Symphony Orchestra, performed a "revolutionary oratorio" by Schaefer at Carnegie Hall in 1930 entitled October which incorporated poems selected by Nathaniel Buchwald from the works of Itzik Feffer, Leib Kvitko, Peretz Markish, Morris Rosenfeld, and others. In 1932 Schaefer traveled to Kharkiv at the invitation of Feffer, where he premiered October, and in 1933 went to Moscow to represent the choir at the International Congress of Proletarian Musicians. There was even the suggestion of a Soviet tour by his New York choir, although it never happened in the end. Upon his return to New York in May 1933 the choir gave another concert at Carnegie Hall. In their 1935 annual concert they once again presented October, while in 1936 they reprised .

Schaefer sought to keep the music of the choir at a high artistic level without making it inaccessible for working class listeners. Education and outreach was also an important element of the choir's work. For most of the 1930s, the conductors of the choir (Schaefer and later Helfman) published annual booklets containing arrangements for voice and choir. The network of affiliated choirs around the United States continued to do well, with a 1936 article estimating it had forty choirs around the country with roughly 4000 members, of which 500 singers were located in New York.

In 1936 Schaefer died unexpectedly at age 48 and the chorus hired prolific composer, accompanist and choir director Max Helfman to replace him in 1936–7. He also became head of the Jewish Workers Musical Alliance in 1938, which dropped the word Workers from its name, and Helfman began to edit subsequent editions of the chorus's published booklets. In 1937 Helfman and the choir performed Schaefer's final unperformed oratorio  (Strike and revolt) at the Venice Theatre. This work, which included dancers and piano accompaniment by Gregory Ashman, sought to portray scenes in the lives of workers via folksongs collected by Soviet musicologist Moisei Beregovsky. The work was popular enough that they reprised it the following year for their annual May concert. In December 1937 the choir also performed in a joint memorial event for Schaefer, George Gershwin, and Henry Kimball Hadley, funded by the Works Progress Administration.

With the start of the Cold War, the choir, mandolin orchestra and its parent organizations were targeted by the US government as subversive organizations. The Jewish Music Alliance was also attacked in the press for its Communist ties. Because of this, in 1948 the choir changed its name to the Jewish People's Philharmonic Chorus. The International Workers Order (IWO) was forced to close and the Jewish Fraternal People's Order which had supported the choir lost its financial base. Many members left the choir for fear of being targeted themselves.

In 1948 the choir performed at Carnegie Hall in its final concert under Helfman, debuting his , a Cantata based on an epic poem about the Warsaw Ghetto Uprising by Itzik Feffer. When Helfman left the choir in 1948 Leo Kopf, a refugee from Germany, took over as conductor. At around this time, owing to the founding of the state of Israel and shifts in American Jewish musical tastes, the choir also began to introduce Hebrew-language material.  It was under Kopf's direction that the choir made its first recording in around 1949–50, a multi-disc set which included a mix of Hebrew and Yiddish materials, and a mix of Helfman's, Kopf's and Schaefer's compositions. In 1952 he also staged the first American performance of Dmitri Shostakovich's 1949 Song of the Forests, translated into Yiddish by N. Buchwald.

Kopf died in March 1953 and Eugene Malek took over as conductor (possibly in 1952 as Kopf's health declined). He remained until 1960 when the choir merged with the Jewish People’s Chorus of New York, an affiliated choir conducted by Maurice Rauch. Rauch became conductor of the new chorus which continued to perform under the JPPC name. Rauch left in 1971 and a series of short-lived conductors took over in the choir: Oscar Julius (1971–2), Rauch again (1972–8), Franco Rossi (1978–80), Rauch (1980), Madeline Simon (1980–84), and Peter Schlosser (1984–95). During this time the number of members dwindled greatly, having only eighteen members in 1981; the number of public performances was reduced as well. 

In 1995 Binyumen Schaechter took over as conductor, a role which he continues to hold at present. He developed the choir, which had lost the ability to perform more advanced arrangements, into a more ambitious ensemble which could perform at a more professional level; this included holding auditions for new members starting in 2002. The choir began to perform more often, including at The Town Hall and at the Museum of Jewish Heritage in 1998, at World Trade Center plaza in 2000, and at Shea Stadium in 2005. In 2006 the choir released a CD, its first album in several decades. The choir appeared at the North American Jewish Choral Festival in Ellenville, New York in 2000, 2001 and 2003 and at the New York International Choir Festival at Lincoln Center in 2002, 2005 and 2006. And in 2007 the choir appeared in Tickling Leo. It then returned to the North American Jewish Choral Festival for several more years, appearing in 2007, 2010-1, and 2013-19.

In 2021, the choir changed its name to its present name, the Yiddish Philharmonic Chorus.

Publications and recordings

Musical scores
  - Songs for Voice and Piano (International Workers Order, 1932, compiled by Jacob Schaefer)
  (1934, by Jacob Schaefer)
  (YMAF, 1935, by Jacob Schaefer)
  (YMAF, 1936, by Jacob Schaefer)
  (1937, by Jacob Schaefer and Max Helfman)
  (YMF, 1938, by Max Helfman)
  (YMF, 1939, by Max Helfman)
  (YMF, 1940, by Max Helfman)
 : 22 Selected songs of Jacob Schaefer (YMF, 1952)
 /Let's Sing: A collection of Yiddish, English and Hebrew Songs (YMF, 1956)

Sound recordings 
 The Jewish People's Philharmonic Chorus, new york, Dr. Leo Kopf, conductor ( 1949–51, RCA Records, 4-disc album)
  ( 1958-60, Tikva Records, the Jewish People’s Chorus of New York conducted by Maurice Rauch)
 , from the treasures of Avrom Goldfaden songs ( 1958-60, Tikva Records, the Jewish People’s Chorus of New York conducted by Maurice Rauch)
  (1967, Tikva Records/YMF, composed by Jacob Schaefer, text by I. L. Peretz, conducted by Maurice Rauch)
 Zingt! A Celebration of Yiddish Choral Music (2006)

References

External links
 Yiddish Philharmonic Chorus official website
 Recordings by the Jewish People's Philharmonic Chorus on the Florida Atlantic University Judaica collection
 1961 jubilee concert booklet of the choir in the Yiddish Book Center digital collection

1923 establishments in the United States
Choirs in New York City
Secular Jewish culture in the United States
Musical groups established in 1923
Jewish musical groups